L'appuntamento (The date), also known as L'appuntamento (...dove, come, quando?), is a 1977 Italian comedy film written and directed by Giuliano Biagetti.

Plot  
Adelmo is a Florentine employee who has an appointment with Adelaide, the most coveted of his colleagues. Thus began to move by car from the center of Florence to reach the woman. On the way, however, he encounters numerous obstacles: a policeman who gives him a fine, a rear-end collision between two cars, until he has an attack of colitis that forces him to look for a toilet in a hotel where he meets his boss in gallant company. When he leaves the hotel, he discovers that his car with the tow truck has been taken away; then he goes to a bar to call a taxi, but in the meantime he meets a colleague who takes him to his house to meet his family. Unexpectedly, the wife of the colleague begins to make advances to Adelmo. Finally in the taxi, Adelmo meets a young and beautiful foreign tourist, who is actually the wife of the Swedish consul who has run away from home and will put him further into trouble.

Cast 
Renzo Montagnani: Adelmo Bartalesi
Barbara Bouchet: Ingrid
Mario Carotenuto: Commendatore
Orchidea De Santis: wife of colleague
Maria Pia Conte:Adelaide Picchioni
Enzo Liberti: taxi driver
: Enrico Tonini, colleague of Adelmo
Antonino Faà di Bruno: father of the colleague
Sandro Bolchi: Amilcare Spaccesi
Giuseppe Rovini: the grandmother of the recruit
Mario Di Maio: the console
Grazia Ignesti: the florist
Emilio Pisani: the policeman
Giuseppe Magdalone: the doorman
Stefanina Pelati: the concierge
Sergio Risso: the tripe

Giò Abrate
Claudia Rericich

See also    
 List of Italian films of 1977

References

External links

1977 films
1977 comedy films
1970s Italian-language films
Films directed by Giuliano Biagetti
Italian comedy films
Films scored by Berto Pisano
1970s Italian films